Winship Cancer Institute of Emory University is a nonprofit cancer research and patient care center based in Atlanta, Georgia. Winship Cancer Institute is the only National Cancer Institute-designated Comprehensive Cancer Center in Georgia.

History
The Robert Winship Clinic was established in 1937 through a gift to Emory of $50,000 from Coca-Cola CEO Robert W. Woodruff, who named the center after his maternal grandfather, Robert Winship, in honor of his mother, Emily Winship, who died from breast cancer. Woodruff’s vision was to create a center in Georgia that focuses on research, education and patient care. The Robert W. Woodruff Foundation, Inc. has continued to support Emory in achieving this vision, and in 2003 Emory dedicated the  Winship Cancer Institute building, constructed with funds from the Robert W. Woodruff Foundation, Inc.

Locations
Winship Cancer Institute is located on the campus of Emory University in Atlanta, Georgia. Affiliate locations include Emory University Hospital, Emory University Hospital Midtown, Emory Johns Creek Hospital, Emory Saint Joseph's Hospital, Grady Memorial Hospital and the Atlanta VA Medical Center. A new 17-story facility called Winship Emory Midtown is scheduled to open in 2023 on the Emory University Hospital Midtown campus.

Research and treatment
In 2014, Winship Cancer Institute was selected as a Lead Academic Participating Site for the National Cancer Institute's National Clinical Trials Network.

Recognition
Emory University Hospital is ranked one of "America’s Best Hospitals" for cancer by U.S. News & World Report.

Notable persons
 Sagar Lonial – Hematologist specializing in multiple myeloma. Chief Medical Officer of Winship Cancer Institute.
 Rafi Ahmed – Virologist and immunologist. Co-Leader of the Cancer Immunology Program.
 Jonathan S. Lewin – Neuroradiologist. Member of the Discovery and Developmental Therapeutics Program.

See also
Emory University School of Medicine
Rollins School of Public Health
Nell Hodgson Woodruff School of Nursing
Emory University
Emory Healthcare

References

External links
Official website

Hospital buildings completed in 2003
Cancer organizations based in the United States
Emory University
Medical research institutes in the United States
Cancer hospitals
NCI-designated cancer centers
Medical and health organizations based in Georgia (U.S. state)
Research institutes in Georgia (state)